The 2022 Georgia Bulldogs baseball team represents the University of Georgia in the 2022 NCAA Division I baseball season. The Bulldogs play their home games at Foley Field.

Previous season

The Bulldogs finished 31–25, 13–17 in the SEC to finish in fifth place in the East division. They were not invited to the postseason.

Personnel

Roster

Coaching Staff

Schedule and results

NCAA Chapel Hill Regional

Rankings

Standings

Results

See also
2022 Georgia Bulldogs softball team

References

Georgia
Georgia Bulldogs baseball seasons
Georgia Bulldogs baseball
Georgia